Yazdabad or Yezdabad may refer to:
 Yazdabad, Isfahan
 Yazdabad, Falavarjan, Isfahan Province
 Yazdabad, Kashan, Isfahan Province
 Yazdabad, Kerman